Todd Jeffery Duckett (born February 17, 1981) is a former American football running back in the National Football League. He was drafted by the Atlanta Falcons 18th overall in the 2002 NFL Draft and also played for the Washington Redskins, Detroit Lions and Seattle Seahawks. He played college football at Michigan State.

Early years
Duckett participated in track & field, where he was a three-time state Class-A shot put champion. He held the state record in the shot put, from 1999 until 2016, at 20.42 meters (67 ft). In sprints, he was a member of the 4 × 100 m relay (42.59s) team and recorded a personal-best time of 10.6 seconds in the 100-meter dash. He was also timed at 4.45 seconds in the 40-yard dash and bench pressed 515 pounds.

Professional career

Seattle Seahawks
On March 4, 2008, the Seattle Seahawks signed Duckett to a five-year contract worth $14 million. He served as a short-yardage back for the Seahawks. Duckett scored a touchdown on a one-yard run on September 14, 2008. Before the game, his number was changed from 45 to 42.

NFL statistics
Rushing Stats 

Receiving Stats

Personal life
T.J. has recently started New World Flood, a non-profit organization that goes into schools and teaches kids how they can start a flood of community service and kind acts in their school, town, city, and world.

In 2012, he started a nonprofit printing company for T-shirts and other clothing items.

References

External links
New World Flood
Detroit Lions bio
Seattle Seahawks bio

1981 births
Living people
Sportspeople from Kalamazoo, Michigan
Players of American football from Michigan
American football running backs
Michigan State Spartans football players
Atlanta Falcons players
Washington Redskins players
Detroit Lions players
Seattle Seahawks players
American football quarterbacks